Kakanj Thermal Power Plant is one of Bosnia and Herzegovina's largest coal-fired power plant having an installed electric capacity of 450 MW and producing around 2.3 billion Kwh of electricity per year.  The power plant is operated by Elektroprivreda Bosne i Hercegovine.
The chimney of Kakanj Power Plant is 300 metres tall and is one of the tallest man-made objects built in former Yugoslavia.

History
Kakanj has been coal mining area since 1898. Construction of the coal-fired power plant started in 1947. and the first and unit was commissioned in 1956.

Construction of the second unit started in 1960 and was finished in 1960. Five more units were constructed in the next 28 years. The last one, unit 7, was finished in 1988. A new 300-MW steam unit is in planning and a 100-MW CCGT block may be built to replace the old 32-MW sets.

Description

Thermal Power Station Kakanj is now one of the largest generators of electricity in Federation of Bosnia and Herzegovina.  It has power generation units with an installed capacity of 578 MW.  

See also

References

Coal-fired power stations in Bosnia and Herzegovina